Hessay railway station served the village of Hessay, North Yorkshire, England from 1849 to 1964 on the Harrogate line.

History 
The station opened in April 1849 by the East and West Yorkshire Junction Railway. The station was situated east of the level crossing on New Road. There were five freight sidings at the station, northwest of the level crossing on the down side with a long head shunt. In 1913 livestock was handled here but there were no general goods facilities; only 'bulk traffic' was dealt with. NER figures of 1911 revealed that 368 people lived within the settlement and only 4405 tickets were sold in the year. During the First World War, most lightly used station closed during 1916–17, although Hessay closed as early as 22 September 1915. A reason for this was due to its closeness to Marston Moor. There was no distinct reopening date for Hessay after the First World War had ended. One service had appeared in the Bradshaw timetable in June 1919 for York passengers, but only on Saturdays. In Reid's timetable of June 1920, 'Hessay (closed)' confusingly appeared with an up service  for c9:15am and a down service for c3:39pm for York passengers and, again, on Saturdays only. In July 1922, services were restored for all weekdays. When the Second World War began, War Department sidings were built at the station on the down side and south west of the existing sidings. Like Goldsborough, there were also wartime additions to the infrastructure, including a blast proof signal box. The station closed to passengers on 15 September 1958 but goods continued to be handled until 4 May 1964. The War Department sidings continued to be used by the Ministry of Defence until 1991.

References

External links 

Disused railway stations in North Yorkshire
Former North Eastern Railway (UK) stations
Railway stations in Great Britain opened in 1849
Railway stations in Great Britain closed in 1915
Railway stations in Great Britain opened in 1922
Railway stations in Great Britain closed in 1958
1849 establishments in England
1964 disestablishments in England